Zhou Tong is a fictional character in Water Margin, one of the Four Great Classical Novels of Chinese literature. Nicknamed "Little Conqueror", he ranks 87th among the 108 Stars of Destiny and 51st among the 72 Earthly Fiends.

There was a historical Zhou Tong, who lived during the late northern Song dynasty, the period Water Margin is set in. According to folklores, he taught the well-known general Yue Fei archery.   The given names of the two Zhou Tongs are written differently in Chinese.

Background 
The novel depicts Zhou Tong as robust and having a broad face and a loud booming voice. A skilled fighter, he uses a long spear in combat. Zhou is nicknamed "Little Conqueror" as he resembles Xiang Yu, a warrior of the Qin dynasty called "The Conqueror", in appearance and with his domineering temperament. Zhou Tong leads a bandit gang at Mount Peach Blossom in Qingzhou (in present-day Shandong).

When passing by Mount Peach Blossom after parting ways with Shi Jin and Lu Da (who later becomes a monk with the name Lu Zhishen) in Weizhou, Li Zhong runs into Zhou Tong, who wants to rob him. After being beaten by Li, Zhou generously offers the latter his stronghold. Li accepts the offer and Zhou takes second position.

Encounter with Lu Zhishen
Running into the daughter of one Squire Liu, who lives near Mount Peach Blossom, Zhou Tong falls for her and demands her to be his wife. Although reluctant, the squire could not object. On the wedding night, Lu Zhishen, who is travelling to another temple in the imperial capital Dongjing after being expelled from the monastery at Mount Wutai for causing too many troubles, comes by Squire Liu's manor.  He is provided lodgings for the night by the kindly old man. When Lu hears the family crying, he finds out the reason and volunteers to persuade Zhou to give up on the girl with his Buddhist teaching. So Lu lies in wait on the bed in the bridal room for Zhou in place of Squire Liu's daughter.

Zhou Tong comes in the finery of a bridegroom and heads to the bridal room. There he gropes in the dark to reach the bed. But when he touches it, he is shocked to find a burly monk there, who gives him a good thrash. Zhou manages to escape back to his stronghold and asks Li Zhong to get back at the monk for him. Li goes to the manor and is surprised to find the guy to be Lu Zhishen. To give face to Lu, Li asks Zhou Tong to forget about acquiring Squire Liu's daughter. Zhou readily gives his word.  Lu Zhishen stays at their stronghold for a few days before resuming his journey.

Joining Liangshan
When the imperial general Huyan Zhuo is fleeing to Qingzhou after being beaten in his military mission to stamp out the Liangshan Marsh, he passes by Mount Peach Blossom and puts up in an inn. That night Zhou Tong's men steal his horse, a gift from Emperor Huizong, from the stable. Mad at the loss, Huyan suggests to Qingzhou's governor Murong Yanda that he would help him wipe out all the local bandits to redeem his defeat at Liangshan.

As they are no match for Huyan, Li Zhong and Zhou Tong turn to the outlaws of the nearby Mount Twin Dragons led by Lu Zhishen for help. Finding Huyan a formidable warrior, the two strongholds conclude that it is better to seek help from Liangshan. Song Jiang leads troops to Qingzhou, where he captures and wins over Huyan. Li Zhong and Zhou Tong are absorbed into Liangshan along with the bandits of Mount Twin Dragons.

Campaigns and death
Zhou Tong is appointed as one of the leaders of the Liangshan cavalry after the 108 Stars of Destiny came together in what is called the Grand Assembly. He participates in the campaigns against the Liao invaders and rebel forces in Song territory following amnesty from Emperor Huizong for Liangshan.

Zhou Tong is involved in the attack on Dusong Pass (獨松關; located south of present-day Anji County, Zhejiang) led by Lu Junyi in the campaign against Fang La. One day when Zhou is scouting outside the pass, the gates suddenly open, out of which charges the enemy general Li Tianrun, who catches him off guard and kills him.  When the campaign is over, Zhou Tong is conferred the posthumous title "Righteous Gentleman of Integrity".

Notes

References

 
 
 
 
 
 
 

72 Earthly Fiends
Fictional characters from Shandong